Joseph Leeming (22 September 1876 – 30 April 1962) was an English footballer who played in the Football League for Bury and in the Southern League for Brighton & Hove Albion.

He also represented an England league team and was on the winning side of the highest scoring FA Cup final ever. He is the father of the footballer Clifford Leeming, born 1920 who went on to play for various clubs including Bolton Wanderers, Bury and Tranmere Rovers.

References

1876 births
1962 deaths
Footballers from Preston, Lancashire
English footballers
Association football fullbacks
Bury F.C. players
Brighton & Hove Albion F.C. players
Chorley F.C. players
English Football League players
English Football League representative players
FA Cup Final players